Allotinus samarensis is a butterfly in the family Lycaenidae. It was described by John Nevill Eliot in 1986. It is found in the Philippines.

Subspecies
Allotinus samarensis samarensis (Philippines: Samar)
Allotinus samarensis russelli J. Eliot, 1986 (Sulawesi)

References

Butterflies described in 1986
Allotinus